The 2019–20 Valparaiso Crusaders women's basketball team represented Valparaiso University during the 2019–20 NCAA Division I women's basketball season. The Crusaders, led by second-year head coach Mary Evans, played their home games at the Athletics–Recreation Center as members of the Missouri Valley Conference. They sought to reach their first NCAA Tournament since 2004. Their season ended when the MVC tournament was canceled due to the COVID-19 pandemic.

Roster

Schedule and results

|-
!colspan=9 style=| Non-conference regular season

|-

|-
!colspan=9 style=| MVC regular season

|-
!colspan=9 style=| MVC tournament
|- style="background:#bbbbbb"
| colspan=6 style="text-align:center"|Cancelled due to the COVID-19 pandemic

Source

See also
2019–20 Valparaiso Crusaders men's basketball team

References

Valparaiso
Valparaiso Beacons women's basketball seasons
Valparaiso Crusaders women's basketball
Valparaiso Crusaders women's basketball